Henry LeRoy Zimmerman Jr. (February 20, 1918 – August 22, 1997) was an American football player who played wingback and quarterback in the National Football League (NFL) from 1940 to 1948. Afterwards, he played professional fast-pitch softball for 26 years, during which he revolutionized pitching.

Early life
Zimmerman was born in Tonganoxie, Kansas to Henry Leroy Zimmerman Sr. and Ivol Gertrude Hawkins and played high school football at Monrovia Arcadia Duarte High School (Now Monrovia High School) in Monrovia, California, where he was a quarterback.  He then went on to play college football at San José State University.  While playing for the San José State Spartans in 1939, the team went 13–0.

NFL career
Zimmerman was drafted in the seventh round of the 1940 NFL Draft by the Washington Redskins.  Zimmerman was the first San Jose State player ever to be drafted by the NFL.  He played for the Redskins from 1940 to 1942.  Then in 1943, Zimmerman played for the Steagles, a team that was a combination of the Philadelphia Eagles and Pittsburgh Steelers (the teams were forced to merge because both had lost many players to military service due to World War II).  He continued playing for the Eagles until 1946, and then played for the Detroit Lions, before finishing his career with the Boston Yanks.

Zimmerman was named to the Pro Bowl in 1942 and named All-Pro twice.  He also led the league in interceptions in 1945 with seven.

Softball career
Zimmerman pitched softball during his last three years at San Jose State. For 26 years after his NFL career, he played professional fast-pitch softball and led his teams, the Fresno Hoak Packers and the Long Beach Nitehawks, to nine world titles. "He developed the riseball and the dropball, which are now predominant pitches in any pitcher's arsenal." He pitched two perfect games and six no-hitters in World Championship play, striking out all 21 batters during one of his perfect games. He was inducted into the International Softball Congress Hall of Fame in 1970 and the award for the outstanding pitcher in the ISC World Tournament is named in his honor. He was also inducted into the Long Beach Softball Hall of Fame.

Personal life
After retiring from the NFL, Zimmerman obtained his teaching credential. He first taught and coached at Parlier High School from 1951 to 1954. In 1955, he began teaching and coaching at Madera High School, where he remained until his retirement in 1981.  He married Dena Mary Otis of Big Timber, Montana on May 3, 1940, and they had three sons.  Zimmerman died in Madera, California on August 22, 1997.

References

External links
 

1918 births
1997 deaths
American football quarterbacks
Boston Yanks players
Detroit Lions players
People from Tonganoxie, Kansas
Philadelphia Eagles players
Steagles players and personnel
San Jose State Spartans football players
Washington Redskins players
People from Madera, California